Patrick McNamara (born 1956) is an American neuroscientist. His work has centered on three major topics: sleep and dreams, religion, and mind/brain.

Biography
In 2022, McNamara, along with Dr. Jordan Grafman of Northwestern University, received a major award from the Templeton Foundation for his seminal contributions to the emerging scientific field of the cognitive neuroscience of religion (See: https://www.cognitiveneuroscienceofreligion.org/)

Books

Published 
 Patrick McNamara, The cognitive neuroscience of religious experience. 2nd edition; Cambridge University Press, 2022, ISBN 978-1108833172
 Patrick McNamara, The neuroscience of sleep and dreams. 2nd edition; Cambridge University Press, 2022, ISBN 978-1316629741
 Patrick McNamara, The cognitive neuropsychiatry of Parkinson's Disease, MIT Press, 2011, 
 Patrick McNamara, The neuroscience of religious experience, Cambridge University Press, 2009, 
 Patrick McNamara, An evolutionary psychology of sleep and dreams. Cambridge University Press, 2004. 
 Patrick McNamara and Wesley J. Wildman, Science and the world's religions, Praeger, 2012, 
 Patrick McNamara, Where God and science meet : how brain and evolutionary studies alter our understanding of religion, Praeger Publishers, 2006, 
 Patrick McNamara, Nightmares : the science and solution of those frightening visions during sleep, Praeger, 2008, 
 Patrick McNamara, Spirit possession and history: History, psychology, and neurobiology. Westford, CT: ABC-CLIO. 2011.
 Patrick McNamara, Mind and variability: Mental Darwinism, memory and self.  Westport, CT: Praeger/Greenwood Press. 1999.

Edited 
 Deirdre Barrett and Patrick McNamara, Encyclopedia of Sleep and Dreams, Greenwood, 2012,

References

External links
 Official page at Boston University

1956 births
Living people
American neuroscientists
Boston University faculty
University of Massachusetts Boston alumni
Boston University College of Arts and Sciences alumni
Neuroimaging researchers